A domed city is a hypothetical structure that encloses a large urban area under a single roof. In most descriptions, the dome is airtight and pressurized, creating a habitat that can be controlled for air temperature, composition and quality, typically due to an external atmosphere (or lack thereof) that is inimical to habitation for one or more reasons. Domed cities have been a fixture of science fiction and futurology since the early 20th century, offer inspirations for potential utopias and may be situated on Earth, a moon or other planet.

Origin
In the early 19th century the social refomer Charles Fourier proposed that an ideal city must be connected by glass galleries. Such ideas inspired several architectural projects along of 19th and 20th centuries. The most famous of these is the building of The Crystal Palace in 1851 at Hyde Park.

In fiction
Domed cities appear frequently in underwater environments. In Robert Ellis Dudgeon's novel Colymbia (1873), glass domes are used for underwater conversation. In William Delisle Hay's novel Three Hundred Years Hence (1881), whole cities are covered by domes beneath the sea. Survivors of Atlantis are found living in an underwater glass-domed city in André Laurie's novel Atlantis (1895). The same idea is found later in David M. Parry's The Scarlet Empire (1906) and  Stanton A Coblentz's The Sunken World (1928).

Authors used domed cities in response to many problems, sometimes to the benefit of the people living in them and sometimes not. The problems of air pollution and other environmental destruction are a common motive, particularly in stories of the middle to late 20th century. As in the Pure trilogy of books by Julianna Baggott. In some works, the domed city represents the last stand of a human race that is either dead or dying. The 1976 film Logan's Run shows both of these themes. The characters have a comfortable life within a domed city, but the city also serves to control the populace and to ensure that humanity never again outgrows its means.

The domed city in fiction has been interpreted as a symbolic womb that both nourishes and protects humanity. Where other science fiction stories emphasize the vast expanse of the universe, the domed city places limits on its inhabitants, with the subtext that chaos will ensue if they interact with the world outside.

In some works cities are getting "domed" to quarantine its inhabitants.

Engineering proposals
During the 1960s and 1970s, the domed city concept was widely discussed outside the confines of science fiction. In 1960, visionary engineer Buckminster Fuller described the Dome over Manhattan, a 3 km geodesic dome spanning Midtown Manhattan that would regulate weather and reduce air pollution. A domed city was proposed in 1979 for Winooski, Vermont and in 2010 for Houston.

Seward's Success, Alaska, was a domed city proposed in 1968 and designed to hold over 40,000 people along with commercial, recreational and office space. Intended to capitalize on the economic boom following the discovery of oil in northern Alaska, the project was canceled in 1972 due to delays in constructing the Trans-Alaska Pipeline.

In order to test whether an artificial closed ecological system was feasible, Biosphere 2 (a complex of interconnected domes and glass pyramids) was constructed in the late 1980s. Its original experiment housed eight people and remains the largest such system attempted to date.

In 2010, a domed city known as Eco-city 2020 of 100,000 was proposed for the Mir mine in Siberia. In 2014, the ruler of Dubai announced plans for a climate-controlled domed city, named the Mall of the World, covering an area of 48 million square feet (4.5 square kilometers), but as of 2016, the project has been redesigned without the dome.

See also
 Air-supported structure
 Dyson sphere
 Force field (technology)
 Geodesic dome
 O'Neill cylinder
 Smog tower

Notes

Space colonization
Science fiction themes
Fictional populated places
City, domed
Emerging technologies
Architecture related to utopias